The 2003 New Mexico State Aggies football team represented New Mexico State University in the 2003 NCAA Division I-A football season. The Aggies were coached by head coach Tony Samuel and played their home games at Aggie Memorial Stadium in Las Cruces, New Mexico. They were members of the Sun Belt Conference.

Schedule

References

New Mexico State
New Mexico State Aggies football seasons
New Mexico State Aggies football